Eesnurga is a village in Viljandi Parish, Viljandi County, in central Estonia. It is located just southwest of the of Kolga-Jaani. According to Estonia Census 2000, the village had a population of 87.

References

External links
Mikskaar, potting soil producer based in Eesnurga

Villages in Viljandi County